Do You Believe in Magic is the debut album by the folk rock group the Lovin' Spoonful.  It was released in November 1965, on the Kama Sutra label. The album features the hits "Do You Believe in Magic" (U.S. No. 9) and "Did You Ever Have to Make Up Your Mind?" (U.S. No. 2).

Do You Believe in Magic was re-released on CD in 2002 with five bonus tracks.

Reception

In his AllMusic review, music critic William Ruhlmann wrote "The album elaborated upon Sebastian's gentle, winning songwriting style... The album also revealed the group's jug band roots in its arrangements of traditional songs... The Spoonful would be remembered as a vehicle for Sebastian's songwriting, but Do You Believe in Magic was a well-rounded collection that demonstrated their effectiveness as a group."

Track listing

Personnel
John Sebastian – vocals, guitar, autoharp, harmonica, organ
Steve Boone – bass, vocals
Joe Butler – drums, percussion, vocals
Zal Yanovsky – electric and acoustic guitar, vocals
Gary Chester – tambourine in “Do You Believe in Magic?”

References

The Lovin' Spoonful albums
1965 debut albums
Kama Sutra Records albums
Albums produced by Erik Jacobsen